Francis Caridad Riquelme Kellys (born 30 May 1998) is a Cuban footballer who plays as a forward. She has been a member of the Cuba women's national team until October 2018, when she defected while being in Edinburg, Texas, United States during an international competitive tournament.

International career
Riquelme capped for Cuba at senior level during the 2018 CFU Women's Challenge Series and the 2018 CONCACAF Women's Championship.

References

1998 births
Living people
Defecting Cuban footballers
Cuban women's footballers
Cuba women's international footballers
Women's association football forwards
21st-century Cuban women